The women's overall competition of the Water skiing events at the 2015 Pan American Games in Toronto were held on July 22 at the Ontario Place West Channel. The defending champion was Regina Jaquess of the United States.

Results

Final

References

Water skiing at the 2015 Pan American Games